Dolidze is a Georgian surname that may refer to:

 Anastasia Dolidze, Russian pair skater of Georgian origin
  Roman Dolidze, Georgian MMA fighter, Europe and World Champion
 Anna Dolidze, Georgian lawyer
 David Dolidze, Georgian mathematical physicist
 Grigol Dolidze (born 1982), Georgian footballer
 Victor Dolidze (composer) (1890–1933), Soviet-Georgian composer
 Victor Dolidze (politician) (born 1973), Georgian diplomat and politician.

Georgian-language surnames
Surnames of Georgian origin